Howtan (also Romanized as Hūtan; also known as Hot Tan) is a village in Kerend Rural District, Dashli Borun District, Gonbad-e Qabus County, Golestan Province, Iran. At the 2006 census, its population was 1,892, in 324 families.

References 

Populated places in Gonbad-e Kavus County